The Association of Free Democrats was a liberal coalition, later party, formed in East Germany on 12 February 1990. It originally consisted of the Liberal Democratic Party, the Free Democratic Party (GDR) and the German Forum Party. In the Volkskammer election of the 18 March 1990 the Association of Free Democrats, heavily supported by the West German Free Democratic Party, polled 5.28% of the votes and gained 21 seats, all parties running on the same lists. Most of the seats went to Liberal Democratic Party members, whose leader Rainer Ortleb became their parliamentary leader. It then participated in the last GDR government led by Lothar de Maizière.

On 27 March 1990, the Liberal Democratic Party and the National Democratic Party of Germany, previously excluded from the coalition, merged into the party Association of Free Democrats. Finally, on 11 August 1990 the Association of Free Democrats party, the Free Democratic Party (GDR) and the German Forum Party merged with the Free Democratic Party.

See also
Liberalism
Contributions to liberal theory
Liberalism worldwide
List of liberal parties
Liberal democracy
Liberalism in Germany

External links
Association of Free Democrats from chronik der wende

1990 establishments in East Germany
1990 disestablishments in East Germany
Germany 1990
Defunct political party alliances in Germany
Peaceful Revolution
Free Democratic Party (Germany)
Organizations of the Revolutions of 1989
Political opposition organizations
Political parties disestablished in 1990
Political parties established in 1990
Political parties in East Germany